The Twenty-first Amendment or 21st Amendment may refer to the:

Twenty-first Amendment of the Constitution of Ireland, a 2001 amendment that introduced a constitutional ban on the death penalty
Twenty-first Amendment to the Constitution of Pakistan, a 2015 amendment that established speedy trial military courts for terrorist offenses
Twenty-first Amendment to the United States Constitution, a 1933 amendment that ended Prohibition
21st Amendment Brewery, a brewery in San Leandro, California